Alfred Guzzetti (born 1942) is a maker of documentary and experimental films and tapes.  His work has been shown at the New York Film Festival, the Margaret Mead Festival, and other festivals in London, Rotterdam, Germany, Spain and France, as well as in installation settings in New York, Copenhagen, and Santa Monica.

Education
Alfred Guzzetti was born in Philadelphia and attended the public schools there.  He earned a BA from Central High School and a second BA from Harvard College.  He studied at Birkbeck College, University of London, as a Marshall Scholar, and received a Ph.D. in English Literature from Harvard University, where he now teaches.

Career
Following a series of films for theatrical productions, Guzzetti's experimental short film, Air, won first prize in its category at the 1972 Chicago Film Festival.  Afterwards he embarked on an autobiographical cycle that included the feature-length Family Portrait Sittings (1975) and Scenes from Childhood (1979), both premiered at the Whitney Museum of American Art.  These led to further autobiographical films, including the recently completed The Gifts of Time (2018), and to collaborations with the photographer Susan Meiselas and filmmaker Richard P. Rogers, with whom he co-directed Living at Risk: The Story of a Nicaraguan Family (1985) and Pictures from a Revolution (1991).  These were political and historical documentaries and prompted later collaborations with Susan Meiselas on Reframing History (2004) and A Family in History, which includes Living at Risk plus a set of 20 short films entitled The Barrios Family 25 Years Later.  In the late 1980s he began a series of conversations with anthropologist Ákos Östör that resulted in Seed and Earth (1994), a portrayal of life in a Bengali village, and Khalfan and Zanzibar (1999), which poses the question of an individual's relation to his culture.  Both of these were made collaboratively with Östör and anthropologist Lina Fruzzetti.  Around 1993 Guzzetti became interested in the experimental possibilities of the new small video formats and began a series of videos that included What Actually Happened (1996), Under the Rain (1997), A Tropical Story (1998), The Tower of Industrial Life (2000), which was shown in the 2002 Whitney Biennial, Down from the Mountains (2002), Calcutta Intersection (2003), History of the Sea (2004), and most recently, Still Point (2009) and Passage (2018).  This experimental strain is related to his collaborations with composers, including his contributions to Earl Kim’s Exercises en Route (1971),  as well as to Kurt Stallmann’s SONA (2005).  He also work collaboratively with Kurt Stallmann on Breaking Earth (2008), a gallery installation for 11 channels of sound and 5 video projections; Moon Crossings (2011), for 15 instruments, electronics and video; the single-channel Time Present (2013); and Among Rivers (2019) for 7 projectors, 28 loudspeakers, and four performers.  With composer Ivan Tcherepnin he created the 16mm film Sky Piece (1978)

Selected filmography

The Gifts of Time (2018) 78 minutes
Time Present (2013) 17 minutes
Time Exposure (2012) 11 minutes
The Barrios Family Twenty-Five Years Later (2011) 131 minutes
Still Point (2009) 15 minutes
Reframing History (2006)
Night Vision (2005) 2 minutes
América Central (2004) 7 minutes
History of the Sea (2004) 15 minutes
Calcutta Intersection (2003) 10 minutes
The Tower of Industrial Life (2000) 15 minutes
Khalfan and Zanzibar (1999) 25 minutes 
A Tropical Story (1998) 9 minutes
Under the Rain (1997) 10 minutes
What Actually Happened (1996) 9 minutes
The Stricken Areas (1996) 9 minutes
Variation (1995) 5 minutes 
The Curve of the World (1994) 8 minutes 
Seed and Earth (1994) 36 minutes
Rosetta Stone (1993) 10 minutes
Pictures from a Revolution (1991) 92 minutes
Living at Risk: The Story of a Nicaraguan Family (1985) 58 minutes 
Chronological Order (1985) 4 minutes
Scenes from Childhood (1980) 78 minutes 
Family Portrait Sittings (1975) 103 minutes
Air (1971) 18 minutes

Collaborative Projects with Composers
Among Rivers (2019), approximately 45 minutes
Time Present (2013) 17 minutes
Moon Crossings (2011) 16 minutes
Breaking Earth (2008) 26 minutes
SONA (2005) 6 minutes
Sky Piece (1978) 10 minutes
Exercises en Route (1971) 6 minutes

Bibliography
"A Few Things for Themselves," New Literary History, XXXIX (Spring, 2008), 251–258.
"Let Us Be Reasonable, Let Us Ask for Everything," in Six Impossible Things Before Breakfast volume 2, ed. Tanya Leighton (2007). Also at http://www.portabledocument.org/pd_books_OA_sitbb_2.html
"Notes on Representation and the Nonfiction Film," New Literary History, XXVII (Spring, 1996), 263-270.
"The Documentary Gets Personal/ Le documentaire à la première personne," catalogue essay for Cinéma du réel, Paris, March, 1993.
Two or Three Things I Know about Her: Analysis of a Film by Godard. Harvard University Press, 1981. 
Translation of "Le film de fiction et son spectateur (Étude métapsychologique)" by Christian Metz as "The Fiction Film and Its Spectator: A Metapsychological Study," New Literary History, VII (1976), 75-105.  Reprinted in Psychoanalysis and Cinema, Macmillan Press, Great Britain, 1982.
"Narrative and the Film Image," New Literary History, VI (1975), 379-392.
"Christian Metz and the Semiology of the Cinema," Journal of Modern Literature, III (1973), 292-308.  Reprinted in Film Theory and Criticism, 2nd and 3rd editions, ed. Gerald Mast and Marshall Cohen, Oxford University Press, 1979 and 1985.
"The Role of Theory in Films and Novels," New Literary History, III (1972), 547-558.
William Rothman, "Alfred Guzzetti's Family Portrait Sittings," in The "I" of the Camera, Cambridge University Press, 1988.
Jim Lane,The Autobiographical Documentary in America, University of Wisconsin Press,  2002.

References

1942 births
Living people
American experimental filmmakers
American documentary filmmakers
Marshall Scholars
People from Philadelphia
Central High School (Philadelphia) alumni
Harvard College alumni
Harvard University faculty
Alumni of Birkbeck, University of London